The November 2014 Bering Sea cyclone (also referred to as Post-Tropical Cyclone Nuri by the U.S. government) was the most intense extratropical cyclone (also a bomb cyclone) ever recorded in the Bering Sea, which formed from a new storm developing out of the low-level circulation that separated from Typhoon Nuri, which soon absorbed the latter.  The cyclone brought gale-force winds to the western Aleutian Islands and produced even higher gusts in other locations, including a  gust in Shemya, Alaska. The storm coincidentally occurred three years after another historic extratropical cyclone impacted an area slightly further to the east.

Meteorological history 

Right after the JMA downgraded Nuri to a severe tropical storm at 00:00 UTC on November 6, the JTWC downgraded it to a tropical storm and issued its final warning for the system, due to Nuri's extratropical transition and diminishing deep convection. In the afternoon, Nuri accelerated northeastward and became completely extratropical east of Japan. Due to an unusually powerful North Pacific jet stream, the extratropical cyclone underwent extremely explosive cyclogenesis on November 7, owing to the energy from differences in air masses. The system split into two centers early on the same day, but the former center on the southwest was absorbed into the new center on the northeast, within half of a day.

The U.S. National Oceanic and Atmospheric Administration provided a slightly higher estimate of 924 mbar (hPa; 27.29 inHg), a pressure which still holds the record for most intense cyclone in the Bering Sea. The extratropical cyclone crossed the International Date Line on November 9, at which time it started to weaken. However, the system's intensity shifted the jet stream far to the north of Alaska, resulting in a large mass of Arctic air invading the United States along and east of the Rocky Mountains, which caused the worst cold wave the United States had experienced since the Early 2014 North American cold wave. Early on the next day, the storm weakened further into a gale-force system and turned northward. On November 11, it turned northwestward, crossed the International Date Line for the second time, and weakened even further. Afterwards, the system made a counter-closewise loop and crossed the International Date Line for the third time, late on November 12. The system eventually dissipated near the Aleutian Islands on November 13.

Impact

North America

Only minor damage was reported on the island which houses a United States Air Force installation.

The northward movement of the cyclone altered the jet stream, which allowed a fragment of the polar vortex to descend from the Arctic region into lower Canada and the Eastern United States, affecting up to 200 million people with colder-than-normal temperatures and early snowstorms. Some U.S. locations had temperatures 45 °F (25 °C) below normal. By the next day, Ishpeming, Michigan had , the most of any location.

See also 

Explosive cyclogenesis
Great Gale of 1880
Columbus Day Storm of 1962
Braer Storm of January 1993
January 2008 North American storm complex
October 2009 North American storm complex
November 2011 Bering Sea superstorm
January 2013 Northwest Pacific bomb cyclone
Typhoon Nuri (2014)
2014 Pacific typhoon season
December 2014 North American storm complex
Great Arctic Cyclone of 2012

References 

Bering
Bering
Bering
Bering
Bering
Bering
Bering
Bering
Natural disasters in the Russian Far East
November 2014 events in Asia
Natural disasters in Michigan
November 2014 events in North America
November 2014 events in Russia
November 2014 events in the United States